Osica de Sus is a commune in Olt County, Oltenia, Romania. It is composed of five villages: Greci, Osica de Sus, Ostrov, Tomeni and Vlăduleni.

Natives
 Gheorghe Șoarece

International relations

Osica de Sus is twinned with:
 Mont-Saint-Aignan, France (1991)

References

Communes in Olt County
Localities in Oltenia